The Messerschmitt P.1099 was a two-seat prototype jet plane designed by Messerschmitt for the Luftwaffe before the end of the Second World War.

History
The design of the Me P.1099 began in the summer of 1943 and was intended as an improvement to the Messerschmitt Me 262. The Me P.1099 was planned in a way which could later be developed into high-speed bomber (Schnellbomber), reconnaissance plane, interceptor, night fighter and trainer versions.

The Messerschmitt P.1099 was a 12 m long, conventional-looking aircraft with a wingspan of 12.6 m. It had a wider fuselage than the Messerschmitt Me 262 and was equipped with a cockpit for two pilots, located at the front end. The planned powerplants were two Junkers Jumo 004 turbojet engines, later to be replaced by Heinkel HeS 011 turbojets in a further development with swept wings, the Messerschmitt P.1100. None of the variants was built, but this project was developed into the Messerschmitt P.1100 all-weather fighter project, which in turn would lead to the single-seat, single-jet Messerschmitt P.1101 design for the Emergency Fighter Program in July 1944.

Variants
The Messerschmitt P.1099 project had different versions of two-seat fighters which retained the tail and the  wing design of the Me 262. All of the projected aircraft variants would be powered by two Junkers Jumo 004 turbojets.

Messerschmitt Me P.1099A 
Jet-powered fighter with a crew of two, developed in January 1944. It retained the wings and the tail section of the Me 262A-2a, but with a wider fuselage. There were three planned versions, differing in armament: Version A with four MK 108 30 mm cannon. Version B with two MK 103 30 mm cannon and Version C with two MK 108 and two MK 103 cannon in the nose.

Messerschmitt Me P.1099B 
A heavily armed variant, developed from the Me 262, of which two versions were foreseen: Version A would be armed with a MK 108 cannon and a MK 112 55 mm cannon. Version B was armed with a MK 114 50 mm cannon. The radio equipment would be a FuG 16, Peil G6, FuG 101 radio altimeter, FuBl 2 blind landing equipment, as well as the FuG 25a Erstling identification friend or foe transceiver.
There was also a night fighter version equipped with two upward-firing MK 108 cannons.

See also
List of German aircraft projects, 1939–45

References

External links

"Wildgans", "Libelle", "Wespe", P.1106: bogus Messerschmitt Projects?

P.1099
1940s German fighter aircraft
Abandoned military aircraft projects of Germany
World War II jet aircraft of Germany